Dame Glynis Marie Breakwell  (born West Bromwich, 26 July 1952) is a British social psychologist, researcher and former Vice-Chancellor of the University of Bath. In January 2014 she was listed in the Science Council's list of '100 leading UK practising scientists'. Her tenure as Vice-Chancellor of the University of Bath was marred by controversy over her renumeration, culminating in her dismissal.

Breakwell has been a Fellow of the British Psychological Society since 1987 and an Honorary Fellow since 2006. She is a chartered health psychologist and in 2002 was elected an Academician of the Academy of Social Sciences.

Breakwell was appointed Dame Commander of the Order of the British Empire in the 2012 New Year Honours for services to higher education. She is also a Deputy Lieutenant of the County of Somerset.

Early life and education
Breakwell was born on 26 July 1952 in West Bromwich, England. She graduated from the University of Leicester with a Bachelor of Arts (BA) degree in 1973, the University of Strathclyde with a Master of Science (MSc) degree in 1974, the University of Bristol with a Doctor of Philosophy (PhD) degree in 1976. Her doctoral thesis was titled "The mechanisms of social identity". Later, in 1995, she was awarded a Doctor of Science (DSc) degree, a higher doctorate, by Nuffield College, Oxford.

In 2002, she lived in a five-bedroom house at Lansdown Crescent. After her dismissal from the Vice-Chancellorship, the house was then up for sale for £3,000,000.

Academic career
 1976–1978 Lecturer in social psychology, University of Bradford
 1978–1982 Prize Fellow in social psychology, Nuffield College, Oxford
 1978 BPS Young Social Psychologist Award
 1984 Associate Fellow
 1987 Fellow
 1993 Myers Award
 1995–1999 Member Social Psychology Section Committee (Chair 1997–1999)
 1978 MA (by special resolution) University of Oxford
 2006 Honorary Fellow of the British Psychological Society
 2014 Science Council list of 100 leading UK practising Scientists

University of Surrey
 1981–1987 Lecturer in social psychology
 1987–1988 Reader
 1991–2001 Professor of Psychology
 1990–1995 Head of Department of Psychology
 1994–1995 Pro Vice-Chancellor (Staff Development and Continuing Education)
 1995–2001 Head of School of Human Sciences

University of Bath
 2001–2019 Vice-Chancellor, University of Bath
Shandong University, China
 Honorary Professor

Current appointments
 Non executive director, NHS Improvement
 Member of the Science & Technology Honours Committee

Criticism of excessive pay
In 2016, former education minister Lord Adonis called for an inquiry in the House of Lords as he criticised the "serious controversy" of salary increases awarded to Breakwell as the Vice-Chancellor of the University of Bath. A pay rise of 11%, well above the 1.1% cap on pay for non-managerial staff across the higher education sector, took her yearly earnings to £451,000. "Put all that together, and Glynis Breakwell is paid almost exactly half a million pounds, more than three times the prime minister’s salary" said Lord Adonis.

It was also reported around the same time by a freedom of information request submitted by Bath councillor Joe Rayment that Breakwell claimed an extra £20,000 in domestic expenses despite living in a grace-and-favour property owned by the university.

In protest against Breakwell's pay package, four MPs resigned from the university court (advisory board) for the University of Bath: Darren Jones, Kerry McCarthy, David Drew, and Andrew Murrison. Critics speculated that the controversy surrounding Breakwell's salary had led to a decline in applications; the university suffered an 18.5% drop in applications from non-EU applicants for the 2018 entry, and an overall 6% drop against an 11.5% jump in applications for Bath's six closest competitors.

A freedom of information request by the Bath Chronicle revealed Breakwell secured a further 3.9% pay rise in the 2016–2017 academic year, raising her total wages and benefits to more than £468,000. This led Adonis to refer to her pay rise – awarded whilst she herself was a member of the remuneration committee that set her salary – as a "disgrace" and to call for her to resign. In response, Breakwell issued a statement saying "The university is committed to the highest standards of governance and treats very seriously any complaint made." Breakwell stepped down from the remuneration committee in October 2017 during a series of reforms described as "largely worthless" in a joint statement from unions. One month later, University of Bath students overwhelmingly passed a motion of no confidence in the university's governance in relation to Council and Remuneration committee.

Addressing the issue of her salary in a 2015 interview, Breakwell stated: "I’m worth it...I’ve been in the job a long time and you do tend to get increases over time in most jobs. Frankly, I don’t think that there is anything I could say that would stop people saying that I earn too much and vice-chancellors earn too much, so I cannot engage in a conversation because I don’t think there is a way through."

Response

On 28 November 2017 Breakwell announced that she would step down as vice-chancellor on 31 August 2018, at the end of the 2017–18 academic year, and take a fully paid sabbatical semester before formally retiring on 28 February 2019. As part of the terms of her resignation, the university wrote off the interest-free loan for her £31,000 car which she kept.

Andrew Adonis called the terms of her resignation "outrageous" and that she was the worst case of "fat-cat pay", saying the sabbatical meant that she would be paid £700,000 to go.  A joint statement from trade unions representing staff at the University of Bath urged for Breakwell's resignation to be effective immediately, citing concerns over Breakwell continuing to exercise authority which generated a "climate of fear" on campus. On 16 January 2018, the university court voted in favour for the immediate dismissal of Breakwell.

Publications

References

External links
 University of Bath profile: Professor Dame Glynis Breakwell
 Full list of publications by Breakwell (University of Bath website)
 Debrett's profile

Dames Commander of the Order of the British Empire
Fellows of the Academy of Social Sciences
Vice-Chancellors of the University of Bath
Living people
British women academics
People from West Bromwich
1952 births
Deputy Lieutenants of Somerset
Alumni of the University of Leicester
Alumni of the University of Bristol
Fellows of Nuffield College, Oxford
Academics of the University of Surrey
English psychologists
Fellows of the British Psychological Society
Women heads of universities and colleges